Skin on Skin may refer to:

Music
Skin on Skin (DJ)

Albums
Skin on Skin (album), Vanity 1986
Skin On Skin: The Mongo Santamaria Anthology (1958-1995) 1999 by Mongo Santamaria

Songs
"Skin on Skin", song by the Boomtown Rats from V Deep and The Boomtown Rats' Greatest Hits
"Skin on Skin", single by Grace (band)
Skin on Skin (Sarah Connor song)
"Skin on Skin", song by Talisman from Five Men Live